David Beynon (birth unknown – death unknown) was a Welsh rugby union and professional rugby league footballer who played in the 1900s.

International honours
David Beynon won a cap for Wales while at Oldham in 1908.

References

External links
(archived by web.archive.org) Statistics at orl-heritagetrust.org.uk

Brynmawr RFC players
Oldham R.L.F.C. players
Place of birth missing
Place of death missing
Pontypool RFC players
Rugby league five-eighths
Wales national rugby league team players
Welsh rugby league players
Year of birth missing
Year of death missing